Didier Mouron (born 3 July 1958) is a Swiss artist (naturalized Canadian). He was born in Vevey. Didier Mouron has been called "The king of the pencil".

Selective exhibitions since 1976 
 Galerie Henry Meyer, Lausanne, Switzerland
 Galerie du Vieux-Port, Québec, Canada
 Kristen Richards Gallery (Trump Tower), New York, US
 Private exhibition at Donald Trump, New York, US
 Mason Art, New York, US
 Mandel & Co, Chicago, US
 The Bardufi Collection, Phoenix, US
 Designer Showcase, Dallas, US
 L.I.D. Fine Arts, Warren (New Jersey), US
 Galerie du Matterhorn, Zermatt, Switzerland
 E.G. Cody, Miami, US
 Pacific Design Center, Los Angeles, US
 Atelier-galerie Didier Mouron, Mt-Pèlerin, Switzerland
 Sitag, Geneva, Switzerland
 Galerie Cazanove, Pointe-à-Pitre, Guadeloupe
 Westin Mont-Royal, "Ouvertures", Montréal, Canada
 Le Parc, "Ouvertures", Mt Pèlerin, Switzerland
 S.B.S, "Ouvertures", Montréal, Canada
 Museum of the Military Aviation, Payerne, Switzerland
 Espace Arlaud, Lausanne, Switzerland
 Expositions sauvages "Off-the-Wall", US, Canada
 Emily Hill, Singapore
 Forbidden City, Beijing, China
 Guangzhou Baiyun International Convention Center, Guangzhou, China
 "The dreams of Mouron", Warner Bros, Los Angeles, US

 Important works 
 La Marée Descendante, 1985, 74 x 38 cm
 Rencontre avec Déméter, 1985, 52 x 68 cm
 Toujours en Vie, 1992, 50 x 39 cm
 Le Judgement de Pâris I, 2005, 84 x 38 cm
 Jesrad, 2005, 36 x 27 cm
 La Chambre, 2008, 35 x 27 cm
 Combien étaient-ils ?, 2011, 70 x 50 cm

 Publications 
  Didier Mouron, Artal Editions, Switzerland
  Words, Images, Primavesi Editions, Canada

 Filmography 
 Dreams of Mouron'', Produced in Warner Bros Studios (Burbank, California)

References

External links 
 Official website

20th-century Swiss painters
20th-century Canadian male artists
Swiss male painters
21st-century Swiss painters
21st-century Canadian male artists
20th-century Canadian painters
Canadian male painters
21st-century Canadian painters
1958 births
People from Vevey
Living people
20th-century Swiss male artists